Marvin Dixon (born on September 9, 1983) is a member of the Jamaica national bobsleigh team and competed in the 2014 Winter Olympics in the two-man bobsled.

Dixon was born on August 9, 1983 in Rockfort, St. Andrews, Jamaica. He has been a member of the Jamaica National team since May 2007.

He was selected to carry the Jamaican flag at the 2014 Winter Olympics opening ceremony.

Before bobsleigh, Dixon was a track & field athlete in high school, where he ran 100m, 200m and also 400m along with Damien Shalon Cox.

References

Jamaican male bobsledders
Bobsledders at the 2014 Winter Olympics
Olympic bobsledders of Jamaica
Living people
1983 births